Norman Edward Wallen (born Norman Edward Walentowski; February 13, 1918June 20, 1994) was a Major League Baseball player for the Boston Braves during the  season.

Wallen was born in Milwaukee, Wisconsin and also died there. He batted and threw right-handed in his 4 games for Boston, having 2 hits in 15 at-bats, with a batting average of .133.

After only two weeks of play in the major leagues with the Braves, Wallen was hit in the knee by a line drive. The injury ended his career in baseball.

He was buried in Holy Cross Cemetery in Milwaukee, Wisconsin.

External links

Baseball-Almanac page

Boston Braves players
1918 births
1994 deaths
Baseball players from Milwaukee
Burials in Wisconsin